John Atkinson is an Australian actor.

Biography 
Atkinson first appeared in the 1998-1999 Australian series Breakers as Steve Giordano. He later portrayed producer Les Markowitz in the fictionalized 2005 American television movie/docudrama Dynasty: The Making of a Guilty Pleasure,  based on the creation and behind the scenes production of the 1980s prime time soap opera Dynasty. Atkinson portrayed Roger McIvor in several episodes of the Australian television drama McLeod's Daughters between 2005 and 2007, and has appeared twice on the Australian medical drama All Saints, in 2003 and 2007.

Atkinson later played Detective Parks in the 2007 American miniseries The Starter Wife and Stephen Mulroney in the 2008–2009 Australian soap opera Out of the Blue.

He played psychopathic killer Derrick Quaid on Home and Away in 2009.

References

External links
 

Australian male soap opera actors
Living people
Year of birth missing (living people)
20th-century Australian male actors
21st-century Australian male actors